Dimitrie Lovcinski was a Bessarabian politician. He served as the second, fourth and sixth mayor of Chişinău ("Head of the city") between 1825 and 1830, 1834-1836 and 1843-1845 respectively, when Bessarabia was a part of the Russian Empire. During his first tenure, Alexander Pushkin wrote The Gabrieliad and started Eugene Onegin while being in exile in Chişinău, and during Lovcinski's second tenure as mayor the Nativity Cathedral was opened in the city.

Notes

External links
 Incursion dans l’histoire de Chisinau, la capitale moldave 

Mayors of Chișinău
Year of death missing
Year of birth missing